Keeley Emma Donovan (born 14 May 1983) is an English journalist and broadcaster, working for the BBC as a weather presenter for television and radio stations in the North of England.

Early life
Donovan was born in Grimsby and grew up in nearby Tetney. Her father, Terry Donovan, was from Liverpool and played professional football for Grimsby Town, Aston Villa, Burnley, Rotherham United, and the Republic of Ireland. Her Irish grandfather, Don Donovan, played for both Grimsby Town and the Republic of Ireland. He managed Boston United from 1965 to 1969. 

She attended the Humberston School. She did a course in media at Franklin Sixth Form College in Grimsby, then studied for a BA at De Montfort University in Leicester. She returned to Grimsby to do a post-graduate NVQ Diploma in Broadcast Journalism at Grimsby Institute of Further & Higher Education in conjunction with East Coast Media.

Career
Donovan started her broadcasting career at the age of 14, presenting for Channel 7 Television (now Estuary TV), a local cable TV station based in Immingham. She went freelance while continuing her studies and began freelancing for BBC Yorkshire and Lincolnshire in 2005 and joined the locally-based Propeller TV a year later.

After studying broadcast meteorology with the Met Office and the BBC Weather Centre, Donovan started presenting weather forecasts for the BBC's regional TV and local radio services in the Yorkshire and North Midlands, East Yorkshire and Lincolnshire and North East and Cumbria regions. She is also a reporter for the regional current affairs magazine, Inside Out, and an occasional newsreader and reporter for the Leeds edition of BBC Look North.

September 2014, saw Donovan join BBC Radio Humberside, presenting the new Saturday morning show. She had participated in work experience at the radio station 15 years earlier.

In September 2015, she co-presented her first networked TV series, the daytime factual show Break-in Britain, produced by BBC Cymru Wales.

In March 2016, it was announced that Donovan would co-present the new BBC series Countryfile Diaries, a spin off of the popular Countryfile programme.

In August 2017, Donovan was named as the new presenter of the Yorkshire and Lincolnshire variation of the BBC's Inside Out; she was previously a reporter for the series.

Personal life
In July 2017, Donovan announced her engagement to fellow BBC presenter Johnny I'Anson, he proposed to Donovan during a romantic walk in the Lake District. They were married on 25 June 2018 in a rustic wedding at Castle Farm near Knaresborough. BBC Look North colleague Harry Gration conducted the ceremony.

Donovan and husband Johnny's first child, a girl, was born on 10 July 2020. They live in Leeds, West Yorkshire.

References

External links
 Keeley Donovan BBC One

1983 births
Alumni of De Montfort University
BBC weather forecasters
English people of Irish descent
English television presenters
Living people
People from Grimsby
People from Tetney, Lincolnshire